Hestad may refer to:

People
Hestad (surname), a list of people with this surname

Places
Hestad, Dønna, a village in Dønna municipality in Nordland county, Norway
Hestad Church, or Hæstad Church, a church in Dønna municipality in Nordland county, Norway
Hestad, Vestland, a village in Sunnfjord municipality in Vestland county, Norway
Hestad Chapel, a chapel in Sunnfjord municipality in Vestland county, Norway